Iliolumbar can refer to: 
 Iliolumbar artery
 Iliolumbar vein
 Iliolumbar ligament